Ficus glumosa also known as the Mountain or Hairy Rock Fig is an Afrotropical fig shrub or tree, growing  up to 20 m tall. It is found over a range of altitudes and broken terrain types, including kopjes, outcrops, escarpments and lava flows, or in woodlands. It is for the greater part absent from the tropical rainforest zone, or the dry interior regions of Botswana, Namibia and South Africa.

Identification 

Bark is cream coloured, flaking, with the branchlets densely covered with yellow brown hairs. Leaves are alternate, broadly elliptical 30 – 140 x 15 – 95mm in size, 3-veined from the base, veins are raised on the underside of the leaf. Figs are 8 to 15mm diameter, hairy and red when ripe, singly or paired in leaf axils, clustered toward branch ends. The fruit is much favoured by birds, bats, antelope, monkey and baboons.

References

External links

Trees of Africa
Flora of the Arabian Peninsula